Stanley Munga Githunguri was a Kenyan politician.

Early life 
He was born on 17 February 1945 in Gachie, Kiambu County and died 30 November 2022. He attended Gacharage primary schools from 1954 to 1957 before going to karura intermediate school.

Education and Career 
He has a degree in political science and economy from Alaska Methodist university in USA and He is a very prominent business man in Kenya and belongs to the Kenya African National Union and was elected to represent the Kiambaa Constituency in the National Assembly of Kenya since the 2007 Kenyan parliamentary election.

Stanley Githunguri is also a successful business man within the city, owning a number of assets including the Lilian Towers building which consists of a five star hotel and Nakumatt Ridgeways which is located at the border of Kiambu County with Nairobi County.

References

Living people
1945 births
Kenya African National Union politicians
Members of the National Assembly (Kenya)